Atriplex sagittata is a species of flowering plant belonging to the family Amaranthaceae.

Its native range is Central and Eastern Europe to Central Asia.

References

sagittata